The Southwestern Medical District is an area or neighborhood located immediately to the northwest of downtown Dallas, Texas.

The medical center includes multiple research, higher education, and clinical institutions, and employs over 35,000 people and attracts nearly 3 million patient visits a year to its clinics and hospitals, providing services from pediatric preventive care to geriatric services, from lifesaving emergency care to heart transplants.

Healthcare institutions

Major institutions with facilities and offices in the Center are:
 American Heart Association
 Parkland Memorial Hospital
 Children's Medical Center Dallas
 William P. Clements Jr. University Hospital

Academic and research institutions

 Texas Woman’s University (Dallas campus)
 UT Dallas Callier Center
 Center for BrainHealth
 University of Texas Southwestern Medical Center
 Texas Tech University Health Sciences Center at Dallas
UTHealth School of Public Health in Dallas

See also

 South Texas Medical Center
 Texas Medical Center

References